The 2001–02 Colorado Avalanche season was the Avalanche's seventh season. At the end of the regular season, Patrick Roy had a goals against average (GAA) of 1.94 and a save percentage of .925. For his efforts, Roy earned the William M. Jennings Trophy and was a First Team All-Star for the fourth time in his career. The Avalanche beat the Los Angeles Kings in the first round in seven games, then San Jose in the second round in seven games, but lost to the higher-seeded Detroit Red Wings in seven games after being up 3–2 in the series and lost game 7, 7–0, against Detroit. Until the 2021–22 season, this remained the last season in which the Avalanche made it past the second round of the playoffs, and in advance, played in the Western Conference Finals.

Regular season
 December 26, 2001: In a 2–0 shutout over the Dallas Stars, Patrick Roy became the first goalie to win 500 games in a career.

The Avalanche finished the regular season first overall in goaltending, having allowed 169 goals. They also led the league in shutouts, with 11. Combined with the 10 games in which the team itself was shut out, 21 of the Avalanche's 82 regular-season games ended in a shutout.

Final standings

Playoffs

Schedule and results

Regular season

|- align="center" bgcolor="#CCFFCC" 
|1||W||October 3, 2001||3–1 || align="left"| @ Pittsburgh Penguins (2001–02) ||1–0–0–0 || 
|- align="center" bgcolor="#CCFFCC" 
|2||W||October 9, 2001||5–4 || align="left"|  Vancouver Canucks (2001–02) ||2–0–0–0 || 
|- align="center" bgcolor="#FFBBBB"
|3||L||October 11, 2001||3–5 || align="left"| @ Edmonton Oilers (2001–02) ||2–1–0–0 || 
|- align="center" bgcolor="#FFBBBB"
|4||L||October 13, 2001||0–4 || align="left"| @ Vancouver Canucks (2001–02) ||2–2–0–0 || 
|- align="center" bgcolor="#CCFFCC" 
|5||W||October 16, 2001||2–1 || align="left"|  Tampa Bay Lightning (2001–02) ||3–2–0–0 || 
|- align="center" bgcolor="#FFBBBB"
|6||L||October 18, 2001||1–4 || align="left"|  Edmonton Oilers (2001–02) ||3–3–0–0 || 
|- align="center" bgcolor="#CCFFCC" 
|7||W||October 20, 2001||5–0 || align="left"| @ Columbus Blue Jackets (2001–02) ||4–3–0–0 || 
|- align="center" bgcolor="#FFBBBB"
|8||L||October 21, 2001||2–4 || align="left"| @ Chicago Blackhawks (2001–02) ||4–4–0–0 || 
|- align="center" bgcolor="#CCFFCC" 
|9||W||October 23, 2001||5–1 || align="left"|  Carolina Hurricanes (2001–02) ||5–4–0–0 || 
|- align="center" bgcolor="#CCFFCC" 
|10||W||October 25, 2001||4–1 || align="left"|  Vancouver Canucks (2001–02) ||6–4–0–0 || 
|- align="center" bgcolor="#FFBBBB"
|11||L||October 27, 2001||0–1 || align="left"| @ Phoenix Coyotes (2001–02) ||6–5–0–0 || 
|- align="center" bgcolor="#CCFFCC" 
|12||W||October 28, 2001||3–2 || align="left"| @ Mighty Ducks of Anaheim (2001–02) ||7–5–0–0 || 
|- align="center" bgcolor="#FFBBBB"
|13||L||October 31, 2001||0–1 || align="left"|  St. Louis Blues (2001–02) ||7–6–0–0 || 
|-

|- align="center" bgcolor="#FFBBBB"
|14||L||November 2, 2001||2–4 || align="left"| @ Minnesota Wild (2001–02) ||7–7–0–0 || 
|- align="center" bgcolor="#FFBBBB"
|15||L||November 3, 2001||1–4 || align="left"| @ Toronto Maple Leafs (2001–02) ||7–8–0–0 || 
|- align="center" 
|16||T||November 6, 2001||1–1 OT|| align="left"| @ Montreal Canadiens (2001–02) ||7–8–1–0 || 
|- align="center" bgcolor="#FFBBBB"
|17||L||November 8, 2001||0–1 || align="left"| @ Ottawa Senators (2001–02) ||7–9–1–0 || 
|- align="center" bgcolor="#FFBBBB"
|18||L||November 10, 2001||0–2 || align="left"| @ Calgary Flames (2001–02) ||7–10–1–0 || 
|- align="center" bgcolor="#CCFFCC" 
|19||W||November 14, 2001||1–0 || align="left"|  Minnesota Wild (2001–02) ||8–10–1–0 || 
|- align="center" bgcolor="#CCFFCC" 
|20||W||November 16, 2001||1–0 || align="left"|  New York Islanders (2001–02) ||9–10–1–0 || 
|- align="center" bgcolor="#CCFFCC" 
|21||W||November 18, 2001||2–0 || align="left"| @ New Jersey Devils (2001–02) ||10–10–1–0 || 
|- align="center" bgcolor="#FFBBBB"
|22||L||November 20, 2001||3–5 || align="left"| @ New York Rangers (2001–02) ||10–11–1–0 || 
|- align="center" bgcolor="#FFBBBB"
|23||L||November 21, 2001||4–5 || align="left"| @ New York Islanders (2001–02) ||10–12–1–0 || 
|- align="center" bgcolor="#CCFFCC" 
|24||W||November 24, 2001||2–0 || align="left"|  Edmonton Oilers (2001–02) ||11–12–1–0 || 
|- align="center" bgcolor="#CCFFCC" 
|25||W||November 27, 2001||4–1 || align="left"|  Florida Panthers (2001–02) ||12–12–1–0 || 
|- align="center" bgcolor="#CCFFCC" 
|26||W||November 30, 2001||5–2 || align="left"| @ Vancouver Canucks (2001–02) ||13–12–1–0 || 
|-

|- align="center" 
|27||T||December 1, 2001||2–2 OT|| align="left"| @ Calgary Flames (2001–02) ||13–12–2–0 || 
|- align="center" bgcolor="#CCFFCC" 
|28||W||December 3, 2001||4–2 || align="left"|  Ottawa Senators (2001–02) ||14–12–2–0 || 
|- align="center" bgcolor="#CCFFCC" 
|29||W||December 5, 2001||4–1 || align="left"| @ Detroit Red Wings (2001–02) ||15–12–2–0 || 
|- align="center" bgcolor="#CCFFCC" 
|30||W||December 7, 2001||4–1 || align="left"| @ Buffalo Sabres (2001–02) ||16–12–2–0 || 
|- align="center" bgcolor="#CCFFCC" 
|31||W||December 8, 2001||2–0 || align="left"| @ Columbus Blue Jackets (2001–02) ||17–12–2–0 || 
|- align="center" 
|32||T||December 10, 2001||1–1 OT|| align="left"|  Mighty Ducks of Anaheim (2001–02) ||17–12–3–0 || 
|- align="center" bgcolor="#CCFFCC" 
|33||W||December 12, 2001||5–1 || align="left"|  Columbus Blue Jackets (2001–02) ||18–12–3–0 || 
|- align="center" bgcolor="#FFBBBB"
|34||L||December 14, 2001||0–3 || align="left"|  San Jose Sharks (2001–02) ||18–13–3–0 || 
|- align="center" bgcolor="#CCFFCC" 
|35||W||December 16, 2001||3–2 OT|| align="left"| @ Minnesota Wild (2001–02) ||19–13–3–0 || 
|- align="center" bgcolor="#CCFFCC" 
|36||W||December 19, 2001||2–1 || align="left"|  Mighty Ducks of Anaheim (2001–02) ||20–13–3–0 || 
|- align="center" 
|37||T||December 21, 2001||2–2 OT|| align="left"|  Calgary Flames (2001–02) ||20–13–4–0 || 
|- align="center" bgcolor="#CCFFCC" 
|38||W||December 23, 2001||6–3 || align="left"|  Minnesota Wild (2001–02) ||21–13–4–0 || 
|- align="center" bgcolor="#CCFFCC" 
|39||W||December 26, 2001||2–0 || align="left"| @ Dallas Stars (2001–02) ||22–13–4–0 || 
|- align="center" bgcolor="#FFBBBB"
|40||L||December 27, 2001||1–3 || align="left"| @ Chicago Blackhawks (2001–02) ||22–14–4–0 || 
|- align="center" bgcolor="#FFBBBB"
|41||L||December 29, 2001||2–5 || align="left"|  Philadelphia Flyers (2001–02) ||22–15–4–0 || 
|-

|- align="center" 
|42||T||January 1, 2002||4–4 OT|| align="left"| @ Nashville Predators (2001–02) ||22–15–5–0 || 
|- align="center" bgcolor="#CCFFCC" 
|43||W||January 3, 2002||3–2 OT|| align="left"|  New York Rangers (2001–02) ||23–15–5–0 || 
|- align="center" bgcolor="#FFBBBB"
|44||L||January 5, 2002||1–3 || align="left"| @ Detroit Red Wings (2001–02) ||23–16–5–0 || 
|- align="center" bgcolor="#CCFFCC" 
|45||W||January 9, 2002||7–3 || align="left"|  Chicago Blackhawks (2001–02) ||24–16–5–0 || 
|- align="center" 
|46||T||January 12, 2002||2–2 OT|| align="left"| @ Edmonton Oilers (2001–02) ||24–16–6–0 || 
|- align="center" bgcolor="#FF6F6F"
|47||OTL||January 15, 2002||0–1 OT|| align="left"|  San Jose Sharks (2001–02) ||24–16–6–1 || 
|- align="center" bgcolor="#CCFFCC" 
|48||W||January 17, 2002||3–2 OT|| align="left"|  Phoenix Coyotes (2001–02) ||25–16–6–1 || 
|- align="center" bgcolor="#CCFFCC" 
|49||W||January 19, 2002||3–1 || align="left"| @ San Jose Sharks (2001–02) ||26–16–6–1 || 
|- align="center" bgcolor="#CCFFCC" 
|50||W||January 21, 2002||3–2 || align="left"|  Buffalo Sabres (2001–02) ||27–16–6–1 || 
|- align="center" bgcolor="#CCFFCC" 
|51||W||January 23, 2002||4–2 || align="left"| @ Edmonton Oilers (2001–02) ||28–16–6–1 || 
|- align="center" bgcolor="#CCFFCC" 
|52||W||January 24, 2002||2–0 || align="left"| @ Calgary Flames (2001–02) ||29–16–6–1 || 
|- align="center" bgcolor="#CCFFCC" 
|53||W||January 26, 2002||4–2 || align="left"| @ Los Angeles Kings (2001–02) ||30–16–6–1 || 
|- align="center" bgcolor="#FFBBBB"
|54||L||January 28, 2002||4–6 || align="left"|  Los Angeles Kings (2001–02) ||30–17–6–1 || 
|- align="center" bgcolor="#FFBBBB"
|55||L||January 30, 2002||2–5 || align="left"|  Nashville Predators (2001–02) ||30–18–6–1 || 
|-

|- align="center" bgcolor="#FFBBBB"
|56||L||February 4, 2002||1–3 || align="left"|  Detroit Red Wings (2001–02) ||30–19–6–1 || 
|- align="center" bgcolor="#CCFFCC" 
|57||W||February 8, 2002||6–0 || align="left"| @ Minnesota Wild (2001–02) ||31–19–6–1 || 
|- align="center" bgcolor="#FFBBBB"
|58||L||February 9, 2002||2–3 || align="left"|  Chicago Blackhawks (2001–02) ||31–20–6–1 || 
|- align="center" bgcolor="#CCFFCC" 
|59||W||February 11, 2002||5–2 || align="left"|  Boston Bruins (2001–02) ||32–20–6–1 || 
|- align="center" bgcolor="#CCFFCC" 
|60||W||February 13, 2002||3–1 || align="left"|  St. Louis Blues (2001–02) ||33–20–6–1 || 
|- align="center" 
|61||T||February 26, 2002||2–2 OT|| align="left"|  Calgary Flames (2001–02) ||33–20–7–1 || 
|- align="center" bgcolor="#CCFFCC" 
|62||W||February 28, 2002||2–1 OT|| align="left"|  Phoenix Coyotes (2001–02) ||34–20–7–1 || 
|-

|- align="center" bgcolor="#FFBBBB"
|63||L||March 2, 2002||1–2 || align="left"|  Dallas Stars (2001–02) ||34–21–7–1 || 
|- align="center" bgcolor="#CCFFCC" 
|64||W||March 4, 2002||2–0 || align="left"|  New Jersey Devils (2001–02) ||35–21–7–1 || 
|- align="center" bgcolor="#CCFFCC" 
|65||W||March 6, 2002||4–1 || align="left"|  Columbus Blue Jackets (2001–02) ||36–21–7–1 || 
|- align="center" bgcolor="#CCFFCC" 
|66||W||March 9, 2002||4–3 || align="left"|  Los Angeles Kings (2001–02) ||37–21–7–1 || 
|- align="center" bgcolor="#CCFFCC" 
|67||W||March 11, 2002||3–2 || align="left"| @ St. Louis Blues (2001–02) ||38–21–7–1 || 
|- align="center" bgcolor="#FFBBBB"
|68||L||March 14, 2002||0–2 || align="left"| @ Atlanta Thrashers (2001–02) ||38–22–7–1 || 
|- align="center" bgcolor="#CCFFCC" 
|69||W||March 16, 2002||2–1 || align="left"| @ Philadelphia Flyers (2001–02) ||39–22–7–1 || 
|- align="center" bgcolor="#CCFFCC" 
|70||W||March 17, 2002||5–4 || align="left"| @ Nashville Predators (2001–02) ||40–22–7–1 || 
|- align="center" bgcolor="#FFBBBB"
|71||L||March 19, 2002||0–3 || align="left"|  Washington Capitals (2001–02) ||40–23–7–1 || 
|- align="center" bgcolor="#FFBBBB"
|72||L||March 21, 2002||1–3 || align="left"| @ Los Angeles Kings (2001–02) ||40–24–7–1 || 
|- align="center" bgcolor="#FFBBBB"
|73||L||March 23, 2002||0–2 || align="left"|  Detroit Red Wings (2001–02) ||40–25–7–1 || 
|- align="center" bgcolor="#CCFFCC" 
|74||W||March 28, 2002||3–2 || align="left"| @ San Jose Sharks (2001–02) ||41–25–7–1 || 
|- align="center" bgcolor="#FFBBBB"
|75||L||March 30, 2002||3–5 || align="left"| @ Phoenix Coyotes (2001–02) ||41–26–7–1 || 
|-

|- align="center" bgcolor="#CCFFCC" 
|76||W||April 1, 2002||5–1 || align="left"|  Nashville Predators (2001–02) ||42–26–7–1 || 
|- align="center" bgcolor="#CCFFCC" 
|77||W||April 3, 2002||6–0 || align="left"|  Atlanta Thrashers (2001–02) ||43–26–7–1 || 
|- align="center" bgcolor="#FFBBBB"
|78||L||April 5, 2002||1–3 || align="left"| @ Dallas Stars (2001–02) ||43–27–7–1 || 
|- align="center" bgcolor="#CCFFCC" 
|79||W||April 7, 2002||4–2 || align="left"| @ St. Louis Blues (2001–02) ||44–27–7–1 || 
|- align="center" bgcolor="#FFBBBB"
|80||L||April 9, 2002||1–2 || align="left"|  Vancouver Canucks (2001–02) ||44–28–7–1 || 
|- align="center" bgcolor="#CCFFCC" 
|81||W||April 12, 2002||3–1 || align="left"| @ Mighty Ducks of Anaheim (2001–02) ||45–28–7–1 || 
|- align="center" 
|82||T||April 14, 2002||2–2 OT|| align="left"|  Dallas Stars (2001–02) ||45–28–8–1 || 
|-

|-
| Legend:

Playoffs

|- align="center" bgcolor="#CCFFCC" 
|1||W||April 18, 2002||4–3 || align="left"| Los Angeles Kings || Avalanche lead 1–0 || 
|- align="center" bgcolor="#CCFFCC" 
|2||W||April 20, 2002||5–3 || align="left"| Los Angeles Kings || Avalanche lead 2–0 || 
|- align="center" bgcolor="#FFBBBB" 
|3||L||April 22, 2002||1–3 || align="left"| @ Los Angeles Kings || Avalanche lead 2–1 || 
|- align="center" bgcolor="#CCFFCC" 
|4||W||April 23, 2002||1–0 || align="left"| @ Los Angeles Kings || Avalanche lead 3–1 || 
|- align="center" bgcolor="#FFBBBB" 
|5||L||April 25, 2002||0–1 OT|| align="left"| Los Angeles Kings || Avalanche lead 3–2 || 
|- align="center" bgcolor="#FFBBBB" 
|6||L||April 27, 2002||1–3 || align="left"| @ Los Angeles Kings || Series tied 3–3 || 
|- align="center" bgcolor="#CCFFCC" 
|7||W||April 29, 2002||4–0 || align="left"| Los Angeles Kings || Avalanche win 4–3 || 
|-

|- align="center" bgcolor="#FFBBBB" 
|1||L||May 1, 2002||3–6 || align="left"| San Jose Sharks || Sharks lead 1–0 || 
|- align="center" bgcolor="#CCFFCC" 
|2||W||May 4, 2002||8–2 || align="left"| San Jose Sharks || Series tied 1–1 || 
|- align="center" bgcolor="#FFBBBB" 
|3||L||May 6, 2002||4–6 || align="left"| @ San Jose Sharks || Sharks lead 2–1 || 
|- align="center" bgcolor="#CCFFCC" 
|4||W||May 8, 2002||4–1 || align="left"| @ San Jose Sharks || Series tied 2–2 || 
|- align="center" bgcolor="#FFBBBB" 
|5||L||May 11, 2002||3–5 || align="left"| San Jose Sharks || Sharks lead 3–2 || 
|- align="center" bgcolor="#CCFFCC" 
|6||W||May 13, 2002||2–1 OT|| align="left"| @ San Jose Sharks || Series tied 3–3 || 
|- align="center" bgcolor="#CCFFCC" 
|7||W||May 15, 2002||1–0 || align="left"| San Jose Sharks || Avalanche win 4–3 || 
|-

|- align="center" bgcolor="#FFBBBB" 
|1||L||May 18, 2002||3–5 || align="left"| @ Detroit Red Wings || Red Wings lead 1–0 || 
|- align="center" bgcolor="#CCFFCC" 
|2||W||May 20, 2002||4–3 OT|| align="left"| @ Detroit Red Wings || Series tied 1–1 || 
|- align="center" bgcolor="#FFBBBB" 
|3||L||May 22, 2002||1–2 OT|| align="left"| Detroit Red Wings || Red Wings lead 2–1 || 
|- align="center" bgcolor="#CCFFCC" 
|4||W||May 25, 2002||3–2 || align="left"| Detroit Red Wings || Series tied 2–2 || 
|- align="center" bgcolor="#CCFFCC" 
|5||W||May 27, 2002||2–1 OT|| align="left"| @ Detroit Red Wings || Avalanche lead 3–2 || 
|- align="center" bgcolor="#FFBBBB" 
|6||L||May 29, 2002||0–2 || align="left"| Detroit Red Wings || Series tied 3–3 || 
|- align="center" bgcolor="#FFBBBB" 
|7||L||May 31, 2002||0–7 || align="left"| @ Detroit Red Wings || Red Wings win 4–3 || 
|-

|-
| Legend:

Player statistics

Scoring
 Position abbreviations: C = Center; D = Defense; G = Goaltender; LW = Left Wing; RW = Right Wing
  = Joined team via a transaction (e.g., trade, waivers, signing) during the season. Stats reflect time with the Avalanche only.
  = Left team via a transaction (e.g., trade, waivers, release) during the season. Stats reflect time with the Avalanche only.

Goaltending

Awards and records

Player awards and trophies
Patrick Roy, William Jennings Trophy
Patrick Roy, First Team All-Star

Transactions
The Avalanche were involved in the following transactions from June 10, 2001, the day after the deciding game of the 2001 Stanley Cup Finals, through June 13, 2002, the day of the deciding game of the 2002 Stanley Cup Finals.

Trades

Players acquired

Players lost

Signings

Draft picks
Colorado's draft picks at the 2001 NHL Entry Draft held at the National Car Rental Center in Sunrise, Florida.

See also
2001–02 NHL season

Notes

References

Colorado
Colorado
Colorado Avalanche seasons
Colorado Avalanche
Colorado Avalanche